Footwear Design and Development Institute is an educational institute headquartered in Noida, Uttar Pradesh.

History 
FDDI was established under the aegis of the Ministry of Commerce and Industry, Government of India in 1986 with an objective to provide human resource and technical services to the industry. FDDI was upgraded to an Institute of National Importance by an act of parliament in 2017.

Campuses

It has campuses at Noida, Fursatganj (Raebareli), Chandigarh, Ankleshwar, Guna, Chennai, Patna, Hyderabad, Kolkata, Rohtak, Chhindwara and Jodhpur.

Admissions 
The FDDI Design Aptitude Test (FDDI-DAT) is a ONE-stage national-level entrance examination for the FDDIs, organized every year by the FDDI Admissions Cell for admissions to undergraduate and post-graduate courses. The first stage of the examination is FDDI-DAT Prelims, which is a pen-and-paper design and general aptitude test, and the second stage is FDDI-DAT Mains, which is usually an in-studio design test and may also include a personal interview and portfolio review. The tests aim to evaluate the candidate's visualization skills, creative & observation skills, knowledge, comprehension, analytical ability,

Academic programs
FDDI conducts professional courses in 
1. Fashion design, 
2. Footwear Design & Production, 
3. Footwear technology, 
4. Retail Fashion Management, 
5. Fashion Merchandising, 
6. Visual Merchandising, 
7. Computer Aided Design 
8. Leather Goods and Accessories Design

The long-term courses are Bachelor of Design for four years duration. FDDI has distinct presence not only in higher education, but, also in the spheres of industrial consultancy, research and development and training of active industry professionals.

Labs and facilities

Labs 
Computer labs
Photography lab
Pattern making & draping labs
Weaving labs
Dyeing & printing labs
Technology labs
Garment technology labs
Leather Design labs
Accessory Design labs

References

Education in Noida
Indian footwear
Educational institutions established in 1986
1986 establishments in Uttar Pradesh
Noida
Indian leather industry
Vocational education in India